was a  located in Kasugai, Aichi Prefecture, Japan. It was built in 1218 by Osaka Kouzen. Currently only ruins are left.

History 
From 1558 to 1573, the castle lord was Sassa Narimasa's subordinate. When the Battle of Komaki and Nagakute occurred in 1584, Ikeda Tsuneoki came there. After the war, Toyotomi Hideyoshi stayed at Jōjō Castle. The founder of Higashikasugai, Mayor Hayashi Kimbei, lived here during the Meiji period.

References 

Castles in Aichi Prefecture
Buildings and structures completed in 1218
1210s establishments in Japan
1218 establishments in Asia
Former castles in Japan
Ruined castles in Japan